Rocky Trimarchi is an Australian former professional rugby league footballer who last played for the Western Suburbs Magpies in the Ron Massey Cup. He had previously played in the NRL for the Wests Tigers and in the Super League for Crusaders.

Playing career
Trimarchi made his NRL début on 16 April 2006, scoring a try in his ninth minute on the field against the Cronulla-Sutherland Sharks. He played for 4 seasons with the Tigers, before being released at the end of the 2009 season.

Shortly before the start of the 2010 season, Trimarchi signed with Crusaders of the Super League. He played one season with the club, appearing in 26 games before returning to Australia.

He is of Italian descent. In 2011, he was announced as a member of the Italian side that competed in the 2013 World Cup qualifying.

Also in 2011, Trimarchi joined Group 6 country rugby league side the Narellan Jets.

References

External links
Rocky Trimarchi at NRL.com
Rocky Trimarchi at Wests Tigers
Rocky Trimarchi at The Rugby League Project

1986 births
Australian people of Italian descent
Australian rugby league players
Italy national rugby league team players
Wests Tigers players
Crusaders Rugby League players
Western Suburbs Magpies NSW Cup players
Rugby league props
Rugby league locks
Rugby league centres
Rugby league second-rows
Living people
Rugby league players from Sydney